Chiaki Tomita (冨田 千愛, Tomita Chiaki, born 18 October 1993) is a Japanese rower. She competed in the women's lightweight double sculls event at the 2016 Summer Olympics.

References

External links
 

1993 births
Living people
Japanese female rowers
Olympic rowers of Japan
Rowers at the 2016 Summer Olympics
Rowers at the 2020 Summer Olympics
World Rowing Championships medalists for Japan
People from Yonago, Tottori
21st-century Japanese women